Douglas Lake is an inland lake located in Cheboygan County on the northern tip of Michigan's lower peninsula. The Lake has two tributaries, Bessey Creek and Beavertail Creek and one outlet, the East Branch Maple River. Douglas Lake is part of the headwaters for the Maple River, a Blue Ribbon trout stream.

Much of the southern shoreline of Douglas Lake is undeveloped as it is owned by the University of Michigan Biological Station and is used for research and educational purposes. The University of Michigan Biological Station and the Tip of the Mitt Watershed Council both maintain extensive records describing the biotic and abiotic features of Douglas Lake.

See also
List of lakes in Michigan

References

External links 

 University of Michigan Biological Station
Tip of the Mitt Watershed Council

Bodies of water of Cheboygan County, Michigan
Lakes of Michigan